KRDR (105.7 FM) is a radio station licensed to serve the community of Alva, Oklahoma. The station is owned by Blue Sky Media, LLC. It airs a classic hits format.

The station was assigned the KRDR call letters by the Federal Communications Commission on November 15, 2012.

References

External links
Official Website

RDR (FM)
Radio stations established in 2015
2015 establishments in Oklahoma
Classic hits radio stations in the United States
Woods County, Oklahoma